Anoka station is a commuter rail station in Anoka, Minnesota, located at 2718 4th Avenue. It is served by the Northstar Commuter Rail line. The station features bicycle lockers and two park and ride lots. The north lot has 181 spaces and the south lot has 196 spaces, with a total capacity of 377 vehicles. The commute time to downtown Minneapolis from this station is about 32 minutes. In 2012, the weekday fare to downtown Minneapolis from this station was $3.00. The fare to and from any other station also was $3.00 on weekdays. In 2022, the weekday fares still were $3.00 to downtown Minneapolis and $3.00 to any other station.

History
The doubled tracked main line for the BNSF Railway transcontinental railroad travels through Anoka after leaving Minneapolis. It runs parallel to the Mississippi River. The former Northern Pacific Railway and Great Northern Railway parallel main lines form this double track main. Anoka had been served by a station at what is now North Street and North 8th Avenue, the Great Northern Anoka Depot. This depot was designed by noted architect Cass Gilbert, and was roughly 4 blocks east of the current platform. This structure was razed in 1993.

The Minneapolis, Anoka and Cuyuna Range Railway, whose tracks ran along East River Road, also served Anoka. Northern Pacific had four local trains each way serving Anoka in 1921. The last passenger trains that stopped at Anoka, the Northern Pacific 3 & 4 trains, were discontinued in 1967.

Notes

External links
Anoka Station, Northstar Corridor Development Authority (NCDA)

Northstar Line stations
Railway stations in the United States opened in 2009
Railway stations in Anoka County, Minnesota
2009 establishments in Minnesota
Anoka, Minnesota